Richard Raynis (born December 27, 1956) is an American animator and television producer. He is a six-time Primetime Emmy Award winner for his work as one of the main producers of The Simpsons. He is also known for co-creating several Adelaide Productions series such as Extreme Ghostbusters, Men in Black: The Series, Godzilla: The Series, Roughnecks: Starship Troopers Chronicles, and Heavy Gear: The Animated Series.

Career
Raynis was born in 1956 in Los Angeles, and began his career in animation at the age of 21 on Ralph Bakshi's The Lord of the Rings (1978), working as a background illustrator. In 1982, he graduated from the University of California, Los Angeles with a degree in English literature. Raynis worked on several shows created by DIC Entertainment in the mid-1980s. He served as a writer and director on ALF: The Animated Series and ALF Tales, and directed numerous episodes of The Real Ghostbusters. In addition, he was an executive on shows such as The New Adventures of Beany and Cecil and Dennis the Menace. Raynis is known as one of the main producers of The Simpsons, for which he has won six Primetime Emmy Awards for Outstanding Animated Program. He began working on the show during its third season while at Film Roman, where he also worked as a producer on the shows King of the Hill, The Critic, and Futurama.

At Adelaide Productions, Raynis worked on various animated series in the 1990s and 2000s. He was an executive producer of Jumanji, which ran from 1996 to 1999. Raynis co-created Extreme Ghostbusters (1997) and Godzilla: The Series (1998–2000) with Jeff Kline, and Men in Black: The Series (1997–2001), Roughnecks: Starship Troopers Chronicles (1999–2000), and Big Guy and Rusty the Boy Robot (1999–2001) with Kline and Duane Capizzi. He was also a producer on Dilbert, Max Steel, Jackie Chan Adventures, and Dragon Tales.

In film, Raynis was a supervising producer of The Simpsons Movie and the shorts The Longest Daycare and Playdate with Destiny. He also produced animation segments for the film The Edge of Seventeen along with David Silverman and various Simpsons staff.

Filmography

Television

ALF: The Animated Series (producer, director)
ALF Tales (producer, director)
The Real Ghostbusters (producer, director)
COPS (producer)
The New Adventures of Beany and Cecil (production executive)
Dennis the Menace (production executive)
The Simpsons
The Critic
Futurama
King of the Hill
Jumanji (executive producer)
Extreme Ghostbusters (developer, executive producer)
Godzilla: The Series (developer, executive producer)
Men in Black: The Series (developer, executive producer)
Roughnecks: Starship Troopers Chronicles (developer, executive producer)
Big Guy and Rusty the Boy Robot (developer, executive producer)

Film
The Lord of the Rings (1978)
The Simpsons Movie (2007)
The Edge of Seventeen (2016)

References

External links

1956 births
Living people
American animated film producers
American television directors
American storyboard artists
University of California, Los Angeles alumni
Primetime Emmy Award winners